Suradej Saotaisong (born May 3, 1981) is a former professional footballer from Thailand.

External links
Thai Premier League Profile

1981 births
Living people
Suradej Saotaisong
Suradej Saotaisong
Association football defenders
Suradej Saotaisong
Suradej Saotaisong
Suradej Saotaisong
Suradej Saotaisong
Suradej Saotaisong
Suradej Saotaisong